The Kalahari worm lizard (Monopeltis leonhardi), also known commonly as the Kalahari spade-snouted worm lizard, is a species of amphisbaenian in the family Amphisbaenidae. The species is indigenous to southern Africa.

Etymology
The specific name, leonhardi, is in honor of German ethnographer Leonhard Schultze-Jena.

Geographic range
M. leonhardi is found in Botswana, Namibia, South Africa and Zimbabwe.

Habitat
The preferred natural habitat of M. leonhardi is shallow sand.

Description
M. leonhardi is purplish pink dorsally, and pinkish ventrally.

Reproduction
The mode of reproduction of M. leonhardi is unknown.

References

Further reading
Gans C (2010). "Checklist and Bibliography of the Amphisbaenia of the World". Bulletin of the American Museum of Natural History (289): 1–130. (Monopeltis leonhardi, p. 36).
FitzSimons V, Brain CK (1958). "A Short Account of the Reptiles of the Kalahari Gemsbok National Park". Koedoe, African Protected Area Conservation and Science 1 (1): 99–104. (Monopeltis leonhardi, p. 102).
Werner F (2010). "Reptilia et Amphibia". pp. 279–370. In: Schultze L (1910). "Zoologische und anthropologische Ergebnisse einer Forschungsreise im westlichen und zentralen Südafrika ausgeführt in den Jahren 1903–1905 mit Unterstützung der Kgl. preussischen Akademie der Wissenschaften zu Berlin. Vierter Band: Systematik und Tiergeographie. Zweite Lieferung ". Denkschriften der medicinisch-naturwissenschaftlichen Gesellschaft zu Jena 16: 1–522 + Plates I–XIX. (Monopeltis leonhardi, new species, p. 328 + Plate VI, figures 2, 2a, 2b, 2c). (in German).

Monopeltis
Reptiles of Botswana
Reptiles of Namibia
Reptiles of South Africa
Reptiles of Zimbabwe
Reptiles described in 1910
Taxa named by Franz Werner